Ammonia borane (also systematically named amminetrihydridoboron), also called borazane, is the chemical compound with the formula H3NBH3. The colourless or white solid is the simplest molecular boron-nitrogen-hydride compound.  It has attracted attention as a source of hydrogen fuel, but is otherwise primarily of academic interest.

Synthesis
Reaction of diborane with ammonia mainly gives the diammoniate salt [H2B(NH3)2]+(BH4)−. Ammonia borane is the main product when an adduct of borane is employed in place of diborane:
BH3(THF) + NH3   →   BH3NH3  +  THF

Properties and structure
The molecule adopts a structure similar to that of ethane, with which it is isoelectronic.  The B−N distance is 1.58(2) Å.  The B−H and N−H distances are 1.15 and 0.96 Å, respectively.  Its similarity to ethane is tenuous since ammonia borane is a solid and ethane is a gas: their melting points differing by 284 °C.  This difference is consistent with the highly polar nature of ammonia borane.  The H atoms attached to boron are hydridic and those attached to nitrogen are somewhat acidic.

The structure of the solid indicates a close association of the NH and the BH centers.  The closest H−H distance is 1.990 Å, which can be compared with the H−H bonding distance of 0.74 Å.  This interaction is called a dihydrogen bond. The original crystallographic analysis of this compound reversed the assignments of B and N. The updated structure was arrived at with improved data using the technique of neutron diffraction that allowed the hydrogen atoms to be located with greater precision.

Uses

Ammonia borane has been suggested as a storage medium for hydrogen, e.g. for when the gas is used to fuel motor vehicles. It can be made to release hydrogen on heating, being polymerized first to (NH2BH2)n, then to (NHBH)n, which ultimately decomposes to boron nitride (BN) at temperatures above 1000 °C.   It is more hydrogen-dense than liquid hydrogen and also able to exist at normal temperatures and pressures.

Ammonia borane finds some use in organic synthesis as an air-stable derivative of diborane.

Analogous amine-boranes
Many analogues have been prepared from primary, secondary, and even tertiary amines:

 Borane tert-butylamine (tBuNH2→BH3)
 Borane trimethylamine (Me3N→BH3)
 Borane isopropylamine (iPrNH2→BH3)

The first amine adduct of borane was derived from trimethylamine.  Borane tert-butylamine complex is prepared by the reaction of sodium borohydride with t-butylammonium chloride.  Generally adduct are more robust with more basic amines.  Variations are also possible for the boron component, although primary and secondary boranes are less common.

See also
 Phosphine-borane (R3P→BH3)
 borane dimethylsulfide (Me2S→BH3) 
 borane–tetrahydrofuran (THF→BH3)

References

Inorganic compounds
Boranes
Boron–nitrogen compounds
Inorganic amines